Silkeborg Idrætsforening, (commonly known as Silkeborg IF or SIF in short) is a professional football club based in Silkeborg, Denmark. The club was founded in 1917, reached the highest level of Danish football in 1987, and afterwards became one of the most successful football clubs in Denmark. They won the 1993–94 Danish Superliga, finished 3rd in 1994–95, 2000–01, and 2021–22, 2nd in 1997–98, and won the Danish Cup in 2001. Silkeborg has participated in Europe several times, winning the UEFA Intertoto Cup in 1996.

History
Founded in 1917, the football section of Silkeborg IF played in the top ranks of Jutland until a short visit in the third division in 1962. In 1966, however the team was promoted to the 2nd division of Danish football. In 1982, the club took the decisive step towards the Danish top football, as the company SIF Football Support A / S was founded, a professional company that would be responsible for professional football in Silkeborg. This resulted in a rise in 1987 to the country's top row, the 1st division. This came as a large surprise to most football enthusiasts and a reporter from the Danish newspaper Politiken wrote, "It will be a surprise if Silkeborg will win a corner kick." The team, however, played well and already in the third game of the season Silkeborg IF defeated Denmark's dominant team, Brøndby with a 1–0 win at home.

1994 championship
There were many vital matches in the 1993–94 season, but perhaps the most important game for Silkeborg was the tournament's third round match at home against Brøndby. Just before the game, the team's big name Jakob Kjeldberg had been sold to Chelsea, and when Brøndby put themselves ahead 2–0 early in the game, it looked difficult for the home team. But Silkeborg totally turned the match upside down and won 4–2 in front of an enthusiastic audience. During the rest of autumn, SIF delivered one attractive game after another. The team lost only 2 of 18 matches and finished the autumn in 1st place.

The playoffs were a thrilling affair. The superior play in the autumn was followed by a more calculating style. Away from home, SIF ran into a few serious defeats, but, in turn, Silkeborg Stadion was a fortress. Here, SIF won six out of seven games and conceded only one goal. In the second-to-last round, SIF could secure the championship with an away win against the only remaining competitor, Copenhagen. Silkeborg fans flocked to the national arena, Parken Stadium, where the match was witnessed by the largest crowd in history of the Danish Superliga, namely 26,679. The many visiting SIF fans, however, witnessed SIF scoring the first goal of the match but eventually losing 1–4.

The situation before the final round was that SIF should provide a better result than Copenhagen to become champions. At home, SIF played Aalborg BK and won 2–0 on two goals by leading scorer Heine Fernandez. In Odense, OB obtained a lead over Copenhagen in the 2nd half and won 3–2 on a goal in injury time, securing SIF the championship.

2001 cup winners and relegation
In 2001, Silkeborg won the Danish Cup with a 4–1 victory against league rivals AB. Behind 0–1 at half-time, the team scored 4 times in the second half of the match by Brian Pedersen, Thomas Poulsen and 2 from Henrik Pedersen. Steven Lustü, who later would become a prominent player for Silkeborg, played the entire game for AB. The following years' results were not very impressive. After the cup victory, the club sold Henrik Pedersen to Bolton Wanderers, Peter Kjær to Beşiktaş and Thomas Røll to Copenhagen. At the same time, Morten Bruun, the player with most caps to his name in the club history, retired. In 2003, the team was relegated to the 1st Division, but returned to the Superliga the following year. For two seasons in a row, the team finished eighth in the league with 12 teams, but in 2007 the team was again relegated. When former player Troels Bech returned to the club as head coach in 2009, however, he transformed the team and helped the club to promotion. Silkeborg finished fifth in the league in 2011, the best result in 15 years.

2018–19 1st Division Title 

In the 2018–19 Danish 1st Division Silkeborg IF were crowned champions of the First Division for a third time, ensuring a return to the Danish Superliga for the 2019–20 season following a one-year absence.

Danish Striker Ronnie Schwartz was the league's top scorer for Silkeborg with 17 league goals registered; sharing the golden boot with Roskilde's Emil Nielsen.

They secured the league title with 61 points, only 1 point clear of nearest rivals Viborg FF ensuring an automatic return to the Superliga.

From promotion to Europe
As Silkeborg IF won promotion to the Danish Superliga in 2021, many experts expected the club to continue its status as a yo-yo club and be in a relegation battle, but head coach Kent Nielsen managed to impress this time in the top division. His attacking style of play with focus on possession and short passing game meant that the club qualified for the championship play-offs for the first time in the club's recent history. Especially the attacking trio, Nicolai Vallys, Sebastian Jørgensen and Nicklas Helenius – often referred to as "VHS" – impressed with many goals and assists.

One of the reasons for Silkeborg's success was seen as their ability to hold on to key players during the 2021–22 winter break, despite interest for Tobias Salquist and Rasmus Carstensen. In the play-offs, Silkeborg managed to beat both FC Copenhagen and Brøndby in historic fashion during the same week. Brøndby were defeated 3–0 and Copenhagen, who had not lost the previous eight games, were beaten 3–1. Ultimately, the season finished in third place and their first bronze medals since 2000–01, as Silkeborg were considered the most "entertaining" and "well-playing" team in the Superliga.

Due to the 2022 Russian invasion of Ukraine, all Russian teams were excluded from European tournaments by UEFA. This meant that the Danish Cup winners entered the final qualifying round for the UEFA Europa League. When FC Midtjylland won the 2021–22 Danish Cup, and at the same time finished in second place in the Superliga, which now gave access to UEFA Champions League qualification, Silkeborg secured Europa League qualification by virtue of their third-place Superliga finish.

Honours

League
Superliga
Champions: 1993–94
Runners-up: 1997–98
Third: 1994–95, 2000–01, 2021–22
1st Division
Champions: 2003–04, 2013–14, 2018–19

Cups
Danish Cup
Winners: 2000–01
Runners-up: 2017–18

International
Intertoto Cup
Winners: 1996

Players

Current squad

Out on loan

Staff

Current technical staff

Managerial history 

 Viggo Jensen (1987–92)
 Bo Johansson (1992–94)
 Bo Nielsson (1994)
 Frank Petersen (1995)
 Preben Elkjær (1995–96)
 Sepp Piontek (1997–99)
 Benny Johansen (1999–01)
 Morten Bruun (2001–02)
 Viggo Jensen (July 2002–Oct 2006)
 Peder Knudsen (Oct 2006–Dec 2008)
 Preben Lundbye (2007)
 Troels Bech (Jan 2009–June 2012)
 Keld Bordinggaard (July 2012–Nov 2012)
 Viggo Jensen (Nov 2012–June 2013)
 Jesper Sørensen (July 2013–December 2014)
 Kim Poulsen (December 2014–September 2015)
 Peter Sørensen (September 2015–August 2018)
 Michael Hansen (August 2018–May 2019)
 Kent Nielsen (June 2019–present)

European cups record

Former notable players

Top goalscorers

Competitive matches only. To matches played 22 March 2017.

Top appearances

Competitive matches only. To matches played 22 March 2017.

References

External links
 Official Site
 SIF4ever.dk – unofficial forum for the fans
 SIFosis – the official supporter group

 
1917 establishments in Denmark
Association football clubs established in 1917
Football clubs in Denmark
Silkeborg Municipality
UEFA Intertoto Cup winning clubs